Gryllodinus is a genus of crickets in tribe Gryllini; species are recorded from Africa, the Iberian peninsula, the middle East and western Asia.

Taxonomy
The genus contains the following species:
Gryllodinus abditus Gorochov, 1979 
Gryllodinus kerkennensis (Finot, 1893) - type species (locality Tunis)
Gryllodinus odicus (Uvarov, 1911)

References

Gryllinae
Orthoptera genera
Taxa named by Ignacio Bolívar